Otto Stammberger (20 February 1920 – 11 July 2000) was a German aviator and World War II flying ace.

On 26 February 1943, Stammberger was appointed Staffelkapitän of 4. Staffel of Jagdgeschwader 26 "Schlageter" (JG 26—26th Fighter Wing). He succeeded Oberleutnant Kurt Ebersberger who was transferred. On 13 May, he was shot down in his Focke Wulf Fw 190 A-4 (Werknummer 0739—factory number). Due to his injuries sustained, he was replaced by Leutnant Helmut Hoppe as commander of the Staffel.

Mathews and Foreman, authors of Luftwaffe Aces – Biographies and Victory Claims, researched the German Federal Archives and found records for seven aerial victory claims, plus four further unconfirmed claims. All of his aerial victories were claimed over the Western Allies and includes five four-engine bombers.

References

Citations

Bibliography
 
 

1920 births
2000 deaths
German World War II flying aces
German World War II pilots